is a passenger railway station located in the city of Chichibu, Saitama, Japan, operated by the private railway operator Chichibu Railway.

Lines

Station layout
The station is staffed and consists of a single island platform serving two tracks. An additional bidirectional loop runs alongside track 2 for use by freight services.

Platforms

Adjacent stations

History

The station opened as Kuroya Station on October 27, 1914. The station name was changed to Wadō-Kuroya Station from April 1, 2008.

Passenger statistics
In fiscal 2018, the station was used by an average of 428 passengers daily.

Surrounding area
 Arakawa River
 
 Hijiri Shrine

See also
 List of railway stations in Japan

References

External links

 Wado-Kuroya Station information (Saitama Prefectural Government) 
 Wado-Kuroya Station information 

Railway stations in Saitama Prefecture
Railway stations in Japan opened in 1914
Chichibu, Saitama